Blaudeix is a commune in the Creuse department in the Nouvelle-Aquitaine region in central France.

Geography

Population

Sights
 The church, dating from the fourteenth century.
 Remnants of a priory of the Knights of St. John.
 Two old mills.

See also
Communes of the Creuse department

References

Communes of Creuse